Corixini is a tribe of water boatmen in the family Corixidae. There are about 9 genera and at least 30 described species in the genus Corixini.

Genera
These nine genera belong to the tribe Corixini:
 Arctocorisa Wallengren, 1894 i c g b
 Callicorixa White, 1873 i c g b
 Cenocorixa Hungerford, 1948 i c g b
 Corisella Lundblad, 1928 i c g b
 Hesperocorixa Kirkaldy, 1908 i c g b
 Palmocorixa b
 Ramphocorixa Abbott, 1912 i c g b
 Sigara Fabricius, 1775 i c g b
 Trichocorixa Kirkaldy, 1908 i c g b
Data sources: i = ITIS, c = Catalogue of Life, g = GBIF, b = Bugguide.net

References

Further reading

 
 
 
 
 
 
 
 

 
Hemiptera tribes
Corixinae